The Institut National des Sciences Appliquées de Lyon or INSA Lyon is a French grande école and engineering school. The university is located on the La Doua – LyonTech campus, in a cluster of science and technological universities and Grandes Écoles. La Doua is located in Villeurbanne, a suburb of Lyon.

The school was founded in 1957 to train highly qualified engineers, support continuing education, and conduct research. The five-year curriculum aims at training engineers who possess human qualities and are well versed in the primary areas of science and engineering. Students may pursue a PhD upon completion of the 5-year curriculum. Graduates from INSA Lyon are called Insaliens.

Preparatory level
The five-year academic curriculum starts with a two-year preparatory cycle where students focus on fundamental sciences such as mathematics, physics, chemistry, mechanics and computer science. This cycle aims to provide INSA engineers with a wide range of skills and competencies, thus allowing them to redirect their careers independently of their initial specialization.

Several special sections are available:

 EURINSA, with half of the students coming from other European countries
 AMERINSA, with half of the students coming from Latin American countries (mainly Brazil, Mexico, Venezuela, Bolivia, Chile, Argentina and Colombia)
 ASINSA, with half of the students coming from Asian countries (mainly China, Vietnam, and Malaysia)
SCAN, with students coming from all over the world, and in which courses taught in English.
SHN, a section for high level athletes
 5 art sections (Music, Plastic Arts, Theater, Dance and Cinema)

For the past ten years, INSA Lyon has been consistently the most desired Engineering school by French high school students who express their wishes through a national portal

Second cycle (Masters of Engineering)
The second cycle lasts 3 years and trains students in 9 departments of engineering:

 Biosciences
Biochemistry & Biotechnologies
Bioinformatics and Modelling
Civil Engineering & Urban planning
Computer science
Electrical engineering
Energy and environmental engineering
Industrial engineering
Mechanical Engineering
Materials science and Engineering
Telecommunications engineering

International

INSA Lyon has a policy of encouraging international education.

 Students are required to spend at least 6 months of their curriculum abroad, either during an internship or as an exchange student. INSA Lyon has over 200 partner universities around the world, 36 double degrees and 7 international laboratories.
There 10 different languages taught at INSA Lyon, and students must study at least two foreign languages.
 There are 30% of foreign students at INSA Lyon, with over 90 nationalities represented.
INSA Lyon's Preparatory Level offers 4 international sections (EURINSA, ASINSA, AMERINSA, and SCAN) with extra language and culture classes.

Research
INSA Lyon is blessed with the largest research funding among Grandes Écoles in France
. It features 23 laboratories.

In 2016, INSA Lyon had 613 PhD students and supported 155 theses.

The school also offers 10 Masters of Science for students interested in research careers.

Student life

Since its creation, INSA Lyon has offered its students the possibility to live on-campus and provide various facilities including various clubs, library, restaurants...

Yearly events 

 February : Le Gala. After the graduation ceremony, a dinner and a celebration party are organized at the Palais des congrès de Lyon.
 Shrove Tuesday : Le Karnaval, a student-run carnival
 April : Le Bal, a prestigious party open to all students
 May : Les 24 heures de l'INSA, France's largest student festival

Student associations 
Over a hundred associations have been registered so far, such as:

Le Bureau des Élèves (BDE): INSA Lyon's student office
Alumni INSA Lyon: INSA Lyon's alumni association
Forum Rhône-Alpes: France's largest engineering job fair
Etic INSA Technologies: 2016 and 2019 France's best junior enterprise
La K-Fêt (ARGIL): student pub
L'insatiable: student newspaper
Le Karnaval: Shrove Tuesday carnival association
Objectif 21: sustainable development association
Exit: LGBT association
BEST Lyon: European association
CLES FACIL: rocket club
Clubelek: mechatronics club
Ciné Club movie club
La Mouette: video club
Graines d'Images: photography club
Club BD Manga: comics club
CLUJI: board games club
Insa Talks: club organizing the yearly TEDxINSA event

Most of the departments also have a student association (Adege for electrical engineering students, AEDI for computer science students).

Rankings
Shanghai Ranking by Subject 2021: INSA Lyon is in the world top 100 in mathematics and mechanics
QS Ranking by Subject 2020: INSA Lyon is among the top 11% universities in Mechanical, Aeronautical & Industrial Engineering and in Civil Engineering ;It ranks in the top 22% of universities in Engineering & Technology, Electrical and Electronic Engineering, Materials Sciences and IT Telecommunications.
Times Higher Education (THE) Impact Rankings 2020: 5th French University for its approach and research activities for sustainable development (#201-300)
 THE World University Ranking 2020: #601 out of 1,400 institutions (top 43%)
 QS World University Ranking 2021: #541 out of 1,600 institutions (top 34%)
 1st place in the ranking performed by weekly magazine Le Point (Le Point – 17 February 2005 – N°1692) of the top French engineering schools (with admittance directly after high school/secondary school). INSA Lyon is also ranked among the top 5 preferred Engineering Schools for recruiters.
 2nd position according to the magazine "l'Expansion", with respect to salary offered for the first employment and after 3 years experience.
 2nd place in the ranking of French Computer Engineering Graduate Schools, according to a survey carried out by the magazine Le Monde Informatique in 2006 (1 Supelec, 2 INSA Lyon, 3 Mines, 4 Polytechnique, 5 Centrale Paris).
 1st place according to L'Express (06/01/2010), among 5-year schools. In the French education system, high school graduates go to "Prepa" courses for 2 years, then compete for engineering schools where they spend 3 more years; whereas other schools like INSA include the "Prepa" as part of their 5-year cursus. Ranking differ between these 2 categories.

Sports 

The LyonTech campus offers many sports facilities that are also available to INSA students. INSA was awarded the title of the best sports university in France. The "Centre des Sports" (sports centre) is run by 18 specialised sports teachers and has four objectives: to supervise sports practices, to run the “Association Sportive” (Sports Association), to supervise students in the top athletes sports section, and to coordinate technological research applied to sports equipment. 
This association brings together students who wish to specialise in the practice of a particular sport. It runs on the basis of one or more training session per week and participates in the French University Championships Approximately one third of INSA students are licensed with the Sports Association. The Association's achievements are excellent, with many French Championship titles being won every year. INSA Lyon students are frequently selected to represent the French National University team at the various University World Championships and in the “Universiades”, participating in many of the Olympic Sports.

Top athletes

Since 1981, INSA has been entrusted by the Ministries of National Education and Sports with the administration of a sports section called SHN (Sportifs de Haut Niveau, literally High Level Sportsmen).
11 students from this section have participated in the Olympic Games.
2 World Champions have graduated from INSA. François Gabart is a French professional offshore yacht racer who won the 7th Vendée Globe race in 2013 and established a new record.

See also
 Institut National des Sciences Appliquées

References

External links
 INSA Lyon

Education in Lyon
Grandes écoles
Educational institutions established in 1957
1957 establishments in France